Vicious Rumors is the only studio album from the R&B band Timex Social Club, released in 1986.  It contains the group's Billboard Hot 100 top 10 and R&B #1 hit "Rumors," as well as the follow-up R&B hits "Thinkin' About Ya" and "Mixed Up World."

Music videos were made for "Rumors" and "Mixed Up World."

Track listings
All songs written by Michael Marshall, except where noted.

U.S. version
The version released in the United States features a different track order from the editions released abroad.
"Rumors"
"Thinkin' About Ya'"
"Mixed Up World"
"Only You"
"Vicious Rumors (Euromix)
"Just Kickin' It"
"Go Away Little Girl"
"Cokelife"
"360° (Natty Prep)"

(all track lengths are the same as on other versions)

Personnel
Michael Marshall: Vocals
Jay Logan: Vocals, Keyboards, Drum Programming
Steve McCraw: Guitars
Bob Spencer: Tenor Sax
Bryan "Beat Creator" Franklin: Beatbox
Isaiah Mosely, Chris Jordan: Drum Programming

References

External links
 [ Vicious Rumors @ AllMusic.com]
 Vicious Rumors @ Discogs.com
 U.S. version of Vicious Rumors @ Discogs.com

1986 debut albums
Timex Social Club albums
Fantasy Records albums
A&M Records albums
Mercury Records albums